Boris Borisovich Nadezhdin (born April 26, 1963) is a Russian opposition politician and Moscow municipal deputy. He served in the 3rd convocation of the State Duma, from 1999 to 2003.

Nadezhdin was close ally of murdered opposition leader Boris Nemtsov. He opposed the 2022 Russian invasion of Ukraine. In April 2022, he said that the Soviet Union had "occupied Czechoslovakia and Eastern Europe."

In September 2022, as Russia retreated from Ukraine's Kharkiv region, he criticized Russia's intelligence services and called for negotiations to end the conflict. He criticized Russia's war strategy stating it was impossible to beat Ukraine using its current methods and materials calling the strategy "colonial war methods." A few days later, on the Russia-1 channel, Kremlin propagandist Vladimir Solovyov called for Nadezhdin to be arrested.

He was born in Tashkent, Soviet Uzbekistan.

See also
Opposition to Vladimir Putin in Russia

References

1963 births
Living people
Third convocation members of the State Duma (Russian Federation)
Politicians from Tashkent